Duncan Township is a township in Sullivan County, in the U.S. state of Missouri.

Duncan Township was erected in 1839, deriving its name from David Duncanson, a pioneer settler.

References

Townships in Missouri
Townships in Sullivan County, Missouri
Populated places disestablished in 2016